Nancy Beth Firestone (October 17, 1951 – October 3, 2022) was a senior judge of the United States Court of Federal Claims, appointed to that court in 1998 by President Bill Clinton.

Early life, education, and career
Born in Manchester, New Hampshire, Firestone received a Bachelor of Arts from Washington University in St. Louis in 1973 and a Juris Doctor from the University of Missouri–Kansas City School of Law in 1977. Firestone served in various capacities as an attorney with the United States Department of Justice from 1977 to 1989. She was the associate deputy administrator of the Environmental Protection Agency from 1989 to 1992, and a judge on that agency's environmental appeals board from 1992 to 1995, when she returned to the Justice Department as deputy assistant attorney general in the Environment and Natural Resources division. Firestone was also an adjunct professor at the Georgetown University Law Center.

Federal judicial service
On October 22, 1998, Firestone was appointed judge of the United States Court of Federal Claims by President Bill Clinton. On October 22, 2013, Nancy Firestone retired from active service on the United States Court of Federal Claims, effectively assuming senior status in that capacity. On April 10, 2014 President Barack Obama nominated Firestone to a serve a second 15-year term. She received a hearing on her re-nomination before the United States Senate Judiciary Committee for June 4, 2014. On June 19, 2014 her nomination was reported out of committee by voice vote.

On December 16, 2014, her nomination was returned to the President due to the sine die adjournment of the 113th Congress. On January 7, 2015, President Obama renominated her to the same position. 
On February 26, 2015, her nomination was reported out of committee by voice vote. Her nomination expired with the end of the 114th Congress on January 3, 2017. She died on October 3, 2022, at the age of 70.

References

External links

1951 births
2022 deaths
20th-century American judges
20th-century American women judges
20th-century American women lawyers
20th-century American lawyers
21st-century American judges
21st-century American women judges
Georgetown University Law Center faculty
Judges of the United States Court of Federal Claims
People from Manchester, New Hampshire
United States Article I federal judges appointed by Bill Clinton
United States Department of Justice lawyers
University of Missouri–Kansas City alumni
Washington University in St. Louis alumni